Edward Huntting Rudd (June 17, 1860 – July 8, 1909) was the minister of the Allin Congregational Church and the chaplain of the Sons of the Revolution.

Early life and education
Edward Huntting Rudd, son of Edward Payson and Elizabeth  Rudd, was born at Sag Harbor, New York on June 17, 1860. He was baptized by William Adams at the Madison Square Presbyterian Church in New York City where his father was active. He attended public and private schools at Sag Harbor and at Rahway, New Jersey, preparing for college at the Rutgers Grammar School in New Brunswick, New Jersey from which he was graduated in the class of 1879. He entered Princeton College, from which he was graduated in 1883 with the degree of AB. In 1886, he received a master's degree. He attended the Princeton Theological Seminary, graduating in the class of 1887. He took a graduate course in Edinburgh University and at the New College, Edinburgh at Edinburgh Theological Seminary in 1884, and took post graduate studies at the University of Bonn in Germany in 1900 and 1901.

Family and personal life
He issued his first book in December 1908, Dedham's Ancient Landmarks and their National Significance. He was a Republican.

Rudd was married on September 29, 1887, to Mary Winslow Dwight of Pittsfield, Massachusetts and they had three children, all born at Albion, New York: Henry Williams Dwight Rudd, born February 7, 1893; Bessie Huntting Rudd, born June 6, 1895; and Edward Huntting Rudd, Jr, born October 15, 1896. Mary's brother was Charles Chauncey Dwight. Rudd was a descendant of John Hunting, the first ruling elder of the First Church and Parish in Dedham, from which the Allin Congregational Church had its origins He was also descended from John Dwight, who was also a founder of Dedham.

Rudd was a loyal Republican. He twice served as president of the Princeton University New England Alumni Association, which he helped to reorganize, and while living in New York City was a member of the Princeton Club there. For 25 years, from 1883 to 1908, was secretary of his college class Princeton.

He was also a member of the Board of Governors and Publication Committee of the Mayflower Society of New England, the Dedham Ministers Club, the Dedham Tennis Club, the Pilgrim Club, and the Congregational Club of Boston, and the Quill Club. He was chaplain of the Society of Sons of the Revolution of the Commonwealth of Massachusetts. In April 1902, Rudd represented the Massachusetts Society at the Triennial meeting at Washington DC and again in April 1905.

He died, July 8, 1909 and was buried in Stockbridge, Massachusetts after a funeral featuring numerous members of the clergy from a number of churches.

Ministry

He was ordained at the Sixth Presbyterian Church in Albany, New York, where he served as pastor from 1887 to 1891. He then was to become pastor of the First Presbyterian Church in  Albion, New York in 1897. He then served as assistant pastor with Rev. Charles H. Parkhurst at the Madison Square Presbyterian Church in New York City. After spending nearly three strenuous years there, Rudd and his family went abroad for a year of study and travel, acting as tutor for another student, and spent the winter of 1899 and 1900 as students at the University of Bonn in Germany. They later visited nearly all the German universities hearing one or more of the professors at each. A very thorough tour was made through much of Europe and Great Britain. While in the Presbyterian Church, he was moderator of the Albany and Niagara Presbytery, a commissioner of the Auburn Theological Seminary, and chairman of the Missionary Congress of New York.

He then accepted a call to Dedham, Massachusetts where he served as pastor of the Allin Congregational Church where he succeeded Joseph B. Seabury. After becoming a member of the Congregational body in New England, he was elected as a member of the Board of Directors of the Massachusetts Home Missionary Society and was chairman of the Co-Operating Committee of the Prudential Committee of the American Board of Commissioners of Foreign Missions. He was President of the Federation of Men's Church Clubs of New England.

Notes

References

Works cited

1860 births
1909 deaths
People from Sag Harbor, New York
Clergy from Dedham, Massachusetts
People from Albany, New York
People from Albion, Orleans County, New York
American Congregationalist ministers
Presbyterian ministers
Sons of the American Revolution